Bundelkhand, a region in central India, has been an ancient center of Jainism. It covers northern part of Madhya Pradesh and southern western part of Uttar Pradesh.

Bundelkhand was known as Dasharna or Jaijakabhukti in ancient times. The Betwa (Vetravati) and Dhasan (Dasharna) rivers flow through it.

It is one of the few regions in India where Jainism has a strong presence and influence. There are many ancient tirthas in Bundelkhand region. Many of the modern scholars and monks of Jainism belong to this region.

Prominent tirthas
Many of the famous Jain tirthas, Vidisha, Deogarh, Lalitpur, Karguanji (Jhansi), Chanderi, Kundalpur, Khajuraho, Aharji, Paporaji, Drongir (Chhatarpur), Sonagir, Nainagiri, Badagaon, Pateriaji, Nisaiji etc. are in this region.

Jain communities
Bundelkhand is home to several Jain communities:
 Parwar
 Golapurva
 Golalare
 Teranpanthi (including Samaiya, Charanagare and Ayodhyavasi)
 Kathanera (also known as Kathanere)

The Khandelwals were originally from Rajasthan, but they have been present in Bundelkhand since ancient times.

Navalsah Chanderia in 1768 in his Vardhamana Purana mentioned 11 communities that were partly Jain. These include
 Grihapati
 Nema
 Asati
A few among them are still Jain and follow the Teranpanthi sect.

The Bhadavar region (Bhind, Morena, Etawah) is adjacent to Bundelkhand and is home to some like
 Barhiya
 Golalare
 Kharaua
 Padmavati Purwar
 Lamenchu
 Jaiswal
 Golsinghare
 Budhele

Gallery

See also
 Mula Sangh
 Balatkara Gana
 Deogarh, Uttar Pradesh

References

 http://bundelkhanddarshan.com
 Digambar Jain Tirth in Bundelkhand
 Kasturchand Jain Suman, Bharatiya Digambar Jain Abhilekh aur Tirth Parichay, Madhya-Pradesh: 13 vi shati tak, Delhi, 2001.
 Siddhantacharya Pt. Phulachandra Shastri, Parwar Jain samaj ka Itihas, Jabalpur, 1990.

Jainism in India
Jain communities
Bundelkhand
Jainism in Uttar Pradesh